The Constitution of Venezuela of 1904 was sanctioned on April 27, 1904. It was the second constitution approved during the government of Cipriano Castro, in it the presidential term was increased to 6 years and the electoral system for the Municipal Councils and Legislative Assemblies was reformed.

Characteristics 

 The presidential term is increased from 4 to 6 years.
 The electoral system for the Municipal Councils and Legislative Assemblies is reformed.
 The Calvo Doctrine is introduced.
 The Federal Court and the Court of Cassation are merged into the Federal and Cassation Court.
 The number of states is reduced to 13.

Amendment 
In 1906 an amendment was approved after two years of discussions of the original project, which was not approved in its entirety. A proposal to extend the political rights of Venezuelans by naturalization and to allow the intervention of the Municipal Councils by the National Congress were rejected.

See also 

 Restorative Liberal Revolution
 History of Venezuela

References 

Constitutions of Venezuela 
1904 in law 
1904 in politics